Kyle Jones (born in Camden, New Jersey), better known as Scratch, is an American hip hop musician who specializes in Beatboxing  and vocal scratch sounds. He is best known as a former member of Grammy Award-winning band The Roots. He is well known in the hip hop and beatbox community for his outstanding ability to simulate the music of a Hip hop Turntablist using only his voice and loop machines.

History

Originally a member of Philadelphia based rap group, Schoolz of Thought, he joined The Roots in 1996.

Scratch released his debut solo album The Embodiment of Instrumentation in 2002 on the Ropeadope record label. It featured The Roots, Dice Raw, Calente from the PBP’s, E.S.T of Three Times Dope, Cyph Born of Aphillyation, Bilal, Jill Scott, Malik B and M.A.R.S. Co-Op. After the release of his solo LP, he abruptly left

In 2004, Scratch contributed to Zap Mama's Ancestry in Progress on the track "Wadidyusay?".

Scratch is a member of Dino 5, who realized their first album Baby Loves Hip Hop in 2008. Scratch plays Teo, a Pterodactyl.

In 2009, he released an album titled Loss 4 Wordz, featuring artists such as Kanye West, Musiq, Damon Albarn, and Peedi-Peedi. He also appeared on British rapper GoldieLocks's EP titled Goldie's Oldies.

Discography

Solo

Studio albums

Singles

Dino 5
 Baby Loves Hip Hop (2008)

Other appearances
 The Roots – Illadelph Halflife (1996)
 Pink – Missundaztood (2001)
 Christian McBride – Live at Tonic (2006)
 Something Sally – Turn On the Radio (Sweet In Stereo) (EP, 2008)

Filmography

Film

Television

References

External links
 Official site
 Scratch's IBA profile

Rappers from Philadelphia
Living people
African-American musicians
The Roots members
Year of birth missing (living people)
American beatboxers
21st-century American rappers
Dino 5 members